is a former Japanese football player.

Playing career
Nishikawa was born in Ishikawa Prefecture on May 27, 1977. After graduating from University of Tsukuba, he joined newly was promoted to J2 League club, Mito HollyHock in 2000. He became a regular player as midfielder. However he could not play at all in the match from July and left the club in September. In 2003, he joined his local club Kanazawa SC in Regional Leagues. In 2004, he moved to Regional Leagues club Matto FC (later Ferverosa Ishikawa Hakusan FC). He played many matches until 2006. However he could hardly play in the match in 2007 and retired end of 2007 season.

Club statistics

References

External links

1977 births
Living people
University of Tsukuba alumni
Association football people from Ishikawa Prefecture
Japanese footballers
J2 League players
Mito HollyHock players
Zweigen Kanazawa players
Association football midfielders